The 1962 American Football League All-League Team was selected after the 1962 American Football League (AFL) season by three separate entities: current AFL players, the Associated Press (AP), and United Press International (UPI), and was published by The Sporting News. The AFL players only selected a first team, while the AP and UPI also selected second teams at some positions.

Offense and defense

Other selections
Return specialist & placekicker: Gene Mingo, Denver Broncos (AP-2)

References

All-League Players
American Football League All-League players